Jens Theodor Suhr Schouboe patented his original semi-automatic pistol in 1903. It was a simple blowback design with an unusual wood core projectile with a metal jacket. By 1917 in the production of these weapons had ceased.

History 
The Schouboe pistol was originally designed in 1903 as a pocket pistol chambered in 32 ACP. In 1907, Schouboe developed a 45 caliber version of the pistol for entry in the 1907 US pistol trials. The trials requirements included the pistol being 45 caliber. The Schouboe was direct blowback, so it could not handle the energy of a traditional 45 caliber cartridge. To get around this, Schouboe made the bullets have a wood core with a metal jacket so that the bullet would be light enough that it could be fired out of the pistol and the pistol would eject safely. The pistol was rejected for not having sufficient wounding ability.

References

External links
The Schouboe Pistol by Ed Buffaloe
Vaabenhistorisk Selskab, The Danish Arms & Armour Society
Patent nummer 6135 af 6. November 1903 af J. T. S. Schouboe gældende fra 2. dec. 1902

Firearms of Denmark
Semi-automatic pistols 1901–1909